The Cheyenne Mountain Division is the J36 branch within the North American Aerospace Defense Command (NORAD) and United States Northern Command's (USNORTHCOM) Operations Directorates, located in Colorado Springs, Colorado.

It was re-designated as the Cheyenne Mountain Division on July 28, 2006, previously having been designated the Cheyenne Mountain Directorate. Before that, the unit was known as the Cheyenne Mountain Operations Center.

The organization, one of the tenants at the Cheyenne Mountain Air Force Station, has been responsible for monitoring North American air space for missiles and other space events that could pose a threat to North America. It operated within the Cheyenne Mountain Complex's Air Warning, Missile Correlation, Command Center, Space Control, and Operations Intelligence Watch Centers.
The division assisted with establishing the integrated NORAD and USNORTHCOM Command Center at Peterson Air Force Base. Operational functions—such as monitoring for threats in the ocean, skies, and space—were moved to Peterson AFB from the Cheyenne Mountain Complex to reduce operating costs. On May 12, 2008, the fiftieth anniversary of the NORAD agreement, the Cheyenne Mountain Complex was designated as the NORAD and USNORTHCOM Alternate Command Center. The Cheyenne Mountain Division then became the J36 branch within the NORAD and USNORTHCOM's Operations Directorates.

Notes

References

Staff (military)
Military units and formations in Colorado
Military units and formations established in 2006
Division
North American Aerospace Defense Command